Maiden of Pain is a fantasy novel by Kameron M. Franklin, set in the world of the Forgotten Realms, and based on the Dungeons & Dragons role-playing game. It is the third novel in "The Priests" series. This novel was the subject of the 2003 Wizards of the Coast novel Open Call. It was published in paperback in June 2005.

Plot summary
Maiden of Pain tells the tale of a priestess of Loviatar.

Publication history
Kameron Franklin was chosen from more than 500 writers to author a novel for the Forgotten Realms fiction line, with the resulting Maiden of Pain released in June 2005.

Reception

References

2005 American novels

Forgotten Realms novels